Istanbul Airport may refer to:

 Istanbul Airport (IST), located on the European side of Istanbul, within the district of Arnavutköy
 Istanbul Atatürk Airport (ISL), located on the European side of Istanbul, within the district of Bakırköy
 Istanbul Sabiha Gökçen International Airport (SAW), located on the Asian side of Istanbul, within the district of Pendik